Maximum PC, formerly known as boot, is an American magazine and website published by Future US. It focuses on cutting-edge PC hardware, with an emphasis on product reviews, step-by-step tutorials, and in-depth technical briefs. Component coverage areas include CPUs, motherboards, core-logic chipsets, memory, videocards, mechanical hard drives, solid-state drives, optical drives, cases, component cooling, and anything else to do with recent tech news. Additional hardware coverage is directed at smartphones, tablet computers, cameras and other consumer electronic devices that interface with consumer PCs. Software coverage focuses on games, anti-virus suites, content-editing programs, and other consumer-level applications.

Prior to September 1998, the magazine was called boot. boot and sister magazine MacAddict (now Mac|Life) launched in September 1996, when Future US shut down CD-ROM Today.

In March 2016, Future US announced that the Maximum PC website would be merged with PCGamer.com, appearing as the hardware section of the website from that point forward. The magazine was not affected by this change. As of July 2, 2018, browsing to MaximumPC.com no longer forwards to the Hardware section of PCGamer.com

Product reviews

Product ratings are rendered by editors on a scale of 1 to 10, with 10 being the best. The only product to receive an "11" rating was Half-Life 2 in January 2005, raising some objections from readers.

Outstanding products are also given a "Kick Ass" award. Exceptional products with a "9" rating and all products with a "10" rating receive this award.

Each review also includes a "Pros and Cons" section, providing a quick summary of the product. Shortly after the "Pros and Cons" first appeared, the editors began attaching humorous notations to their entries, many being puns or word play on the product itself or its function. For example, in a review of two monitors, one section is captioned LCD (pros) vs. LSD (cons). In another it is liquid crystal (pros) vs. crystal meth (cons). Other "Pros and Cons" comparisons have used B-58 vs. XB-70, Miley Cyrus vs. Billy Ray Cyrus, Delicious vs. Malicious, 3dfx Voodoo2 vs. 3dfx Voodoo3, Nvidia RIVA 128 vs. Nvidia RIVA TNT, AA Batteries vs. D Batteries, Fast Times at Ridgemont High vs. The Fast and the Furious, PCB vs. QVC, Counter-Strike vs. Hexen II, Matrix vs. Matrix Reloaded, 10012 vs. 90210, Mars vs. SARS, Comedy Central vs. Lifetime, QWERTY vs. DVDRAM, Jimi Hendrix vs. Jimmy Fallon, Liberty Bell vs. Taco Bell, KVM, vs. Kia, Form Factor vs. Fear Factor, Nvidia vs. Chlamydia, RAID 1 vs. Police raid, Fat Tire Ale vs. Budweiser, College vs. The Real World, and Powered Sub vs. TOGO's Sub.

Notable features
How To – detailed guides for things like creating a RAM disk or sharing a mouse and keyboard between two PCs.
Ask the Doctor – advice for fixing computer-related problems.
R&D – a look into the inner workings of commonly used hardware today.
In the Lab – a behind-the-scenes look at Maximum PC testing.  This section often includes humorous features sometimes involving "torturing" interns.
Softy Awards – a yearly roundup of the staff's favorite new software (mostly utilities)
Facebook poll – A monthly question about anything to do with tech. It includes comments from readers that are usually funny.
Quickstart – a selection of brief news items bringing readers up to speed on notable events in PC technology.
Comments – reader mail and questions
Dream Machine – an annual attempt to build the best-performing PC on the market, using the best components and techniques available.
Build It – a monthly walk-through of a new and interesting PC build, such as a computer submerged in mineral oil.
Geek Quiz – an annual computer/technology quiz that claims it will have even the most hardcore geeks grinding their teeth.
Gear of the Year – a review of the best PC parts for the current year.
Tech Preview – an annual sneak-peek of upcoming hardware.

Circulation
The magazine claims a 2010 circulation rate-base of 250,000.

Maximum PC also provides an archive of back-issues in PDF format free of charge on their website.  This archive currently reaches back to the December, 2003 issue although nothing new has been published since the October 2014 issue.

All but a few of the Maximum PC issues published from October 1998 to December 2008 are available to view on various archival websites, such as Google Book Search.

Staff
Editor-in-Chief: Guy Cocker
Staff Writers: Christian Guyton, Sam Lewis

Maximum PC also has many freelance contributors, including Ian Evenden, Kris Butterill, Chris Lloyd, Jarred Walton, John Knight, Alex Cox, Neil Mohr, Phil Iwanuik, and Matt Hanson.

Maximum Tech
In September 2010, the Maximum PC editors started producing a quarterly magazine focusing on consumer tech.  The basic idea of Maximum PC "Minimum BS" would be preserved in the magazine. The last issue of Maximum Tech was the Sept/Oct 2011 issue.

Italian edition
An Italian edition of Maximum PC was launched in December 2004 by Future Media Italy, the Italian division of Future Publishing, and ceased publishing after only six issues.

See also 
 Custom PC – British magazine with same focus

Notes

References

External links

Maximum PC forums
Maximum PC No BS Podcast
Maximum Tech
Maximum PC Magazine at Archive.org

Computer magazines published in the United States
Monthly magazines published in the United States
Downloadable magazines
Magazines established in 1996
Magazines published in San Francisco